Gmelanone is a lignan found in the heartwood of Gmelina arborea.  Arboreol can be transformed by acid catalysis into gmelanone.

References 

Lignans
Benzodioxoles